Manuel Ntumba is a Congolese-Togolese inventor, advisor, geostrategist and geospatial expert. He is the global chairman and CEO of the global public-private partnership Tod'Aérs Global Network [TGN].

Biography 
From May 2021 to May 2022, Ntumba was a Regional Partnership Manager at the Space Generation Advisory Council - in support of the United Nations Programme on Space Applications, affiliated with the United Nations Office for Outer Space Affairs (UNOOSA) based in Vienna, Austria. Where he was overseeing all regional strategic partnerships for all 54 African countries, and member-states of the United Nations.

Ntumba was born to a Congolese father from the Democratic Republic of Congo and a Togolese mother. Ntumba graduated in telecommunications engineering with a specialization in satellite telecommunications.

Ntumba completed an executive-level program in financial technology and digital economy from the International Finance Corporation (World Bank Group) and Alipay (Alibaba Group). Ntumba worked as an Advisor on space affairs and geospatial intelligence to the African Union Presidential Panel of 2021 previously chaired by His Excellency President Félix Antoine Tshisekedi Tshilombo: President of the Democratic Republic of Congo (DRC) and former President of the African Union (2021-2022); to develop a roadmap for the use of space technologies, digital transformation, and geospatial applications to achieve the Agenda 2063 of the African Union (AU).

Ntumba worked as an expert in geospatial information and earth observation within the consortium on geospatial information of the Erasmus+ Sector Skills Alliance of the European Union, alongside experts from all over Europe.

Tod'Aérs Global Network [TGN], was co-founded by Ntumba in 2020 which is a global public-private partnership (PPP), established with a vision to support global sustainable development, technological innovation, and socio-economic progress worldwide.

References 

Living people
Democratic Republic of the Congo engineers
Year of birth missing (living people)
Togolese people